Olipa is an uninhabited islet in Croatia, part of the Elaphiti Islands archipelago off the coast of southern Dalmatia. It is the westernmost isle in the Elaphites. Olipa is mostly rocky and partially covered in forest. A stone square tower is located on the south side of the isle, which serves as a lighthouse. The lighthouse is used for maritime routes passing through the passages of Veliki Vratnik (between Olipa and Tajan) and Mali Vratnik (between Olipa and Pelješac).

References 

Islets of Croatia
Islands of the Adriatic Sea
Uninhabited islands of Croatia
Elaphiti Islands